Events in the year 1161 in Norway.

Incumbents
Monarch: Magnus V Erlingsson (along with Haakon II Sigurdsson)

Events
 3 February - King Inge I of Norway was defeated and killed while leading his men into battle against Haakon II of Norway near Oslo.

Arts and literature

Births

Deaths
4 February – Inge I of Norway, King (born c. 1135).

References

Norway